Buffalo Presbyterian Church, or variations with "Old" or otherwise, may refer to:
 Buffalo Presbyterian Church and Cemetery, Greensboro, North Carolina, listed on the National Register of Historic Places (NRHP), also known as Buffalo Presbyterian Church (Greensboro, North Carolina)
 Buffalo Presbyterian Church and Cemeteries, Sanford, North Carolina, NRHP-listed
 Buffalo Presbyterian Church (Lewisburg, Pennsylvania), NRHP-listed, also known as "Old Buffalo Presbyterian Church"
 Buffalo Presbyterian Church (Pamplin, Virginia), NRHP-listed
 Buffalo Mountain Presbyterian Church and Cemetery, Willis, Virginia, NRHP-listed
Buffalo Presbyterian Church (Montello, Wisconsin), a Presbyterian historic site